The Prize in Game Theory and Computer Science in Honour of Ehud Kalai is an award given by the Game Theory Society. The prize is awarded for outstanding articles at the interface of game theory and computer science. Following the eligibility rules of the Gödel Prize, preference is given to authors who are 45 years old or younger at the time of the award. It was established in 2008 by a donation from Yoav Shoham in honor of the Ehud Kalai's contributions in bridging these two fields.

Recipients

See also

 List of economics awards
 List of prizes named after people
 John Bates Clark Medal

References

Economics awards
Awards established in 2008
Computer science awards